These are the programs aired on DZBB, the flagship AM station of GMA Network in Metro Manila. Selected programs are also simulcasted via its television counterpart Dobol B TV block on GTV.

Current programs
 Ano'ng Say N'yo? 
 Editoryal ng Bayan
 Balitang Balita sa Dobol B 
 Bahay at Buhay Kasama si Lala Roque 
 Bangon na, Bayan! 
 Bigtime Balita 
 Buena Manong Balita 
 Dobol B: Bantay Balita sa Kongreso 
 Dobol B Insider 
 Dobol Weng sa Dobol B 
 DZBB Executive Summary 
 DZBB Super Serbisyo: Trabaho at Negosyo   
 Golden Memories with DJ Richard 
 Harana at Balita 
 Headline Balita 
 The "Long Tall" Howard Medina Show 
 Konsyumer Atbp.  
 Markado 
 Melo Del Prado sa Super Radyo DZBB 
 MX3 Prayer Watch: Oras ng Panalangin 
 One on One: Walang Personalan 
 Pinoy M.D. sa Super Radyo DZBB 
 Presinto 594 Overload 
 Radyo Romantiko 
 Ratsada ng mga Balita 
 Riding in Tandem sa Balita 
 Round Up Kasama si Orly Trinidad 
 MMDA sa GMA  
 Weekend Round Up 
 Saksi sa Dobol B 
 SOS: Serbisyo on the Spot 
 SumasaPuso 
 Sunday Guwapo 
 Super Balita 
 Super Balita sa Umaga Nationwide 
 Super Balita sa Umaga (Weekends)
 Super Balita sa Tanghali Nationwide  
 Super Balita sa Tanghali (Weekends) 
 Super Balita sa Hapon (Weekdays) 
 Super Balita sa Hapon (Weekends)
 Super Balita sa Gabi (Weekdays)
 Super Radyo DZBB Flash Report 
 Super Radyo DZBB News Flash 
 Super Radyo DZBB Special Coverage 
 TKO: Talakayan Komentaryo’t Opinyon  
 Umaga Na, Balita Na! 
 Usap Tayo: Super Kwentuhan with Mark and Susan

Television programs simulcast over GMA Network
 24 Oras 
 24 Oras Weekend 
 Fast Talk with Boy Abunda (delayed simulcast from 5:10 pm to 5:30 pm)
 Saksi (delayed simulcast from Monday - Thursday and Live on Friday, 11:15 pm to 12:00 mn on the next day)

Previously aired programs
 Ako Naman (1992–1997)
 Aksyon Oro Mismo (2008–2014)
 Aksyon: Roco at Raul (1998–2001)
 Aldabes with Al Mendes
 Ang Inyong Kabalikat (1989–1998)
 Ang Inyong Kabisig (1989–1997)
 Ating Pagmasdan (1987–1991)
 Balitanghali (Q and GMA News TV simulcast) (2006–2014)
 Balita Oro Mismo
 Balita Na, Harana Pa
 Balitang Panghapon (1987–1989)
 Balitang Panggabi (1987–1989)
 Balitang Todo-Todo (2011–2019)
 Bantay sa Balita (1990–1999)
 Bantayog sa Araw
 Barangay Love Stories (2020–2022)
 Bidang-Bida (1995-1999)
 Bidang-Bida sa Dobol B (2019–2020)
 Dear BB Presents
 ASAL: Ang Sa Akin Lang
 Da Hu?
 Bisig Bayan Network Balita (1989–1999)
 Morning
 Midday
 Afternoon
 Weekend
 Bisitang Artista / Balitang Showbiz / Master Showman sa Dobol B (1975–2016)
 Buhay at Kalusugan (2007–2012)
 Buhay-Buhay (2018–2020)
 Boses ng Balita (2011–2021)
 Boses N'yo Sa Senado (1987–1992)
 Break Muna Tayo!
 Brigada Siete
 Radio edition
 GMA Network simulcast
 Camay Theater of the Air (1950–1972)
 Cathay Broadcasting (Chinese language radio program)
 CelebriTV (GMA Network simulcast) (2015–2016)
 Chevrolet Sunday Concert Hour (1965–1972)
 Compañero y Compañera (1998–2000)
 Dis is Manolo (1980–2020)
 Dear Dobol B (2020–2022)
 Doble Banda (1998–2001)
 Dobol A sa Dobol B (1998–2008; 2014–2020)
 Dobol B: Balitang Balita (2008–2020)
 Dobol B: Bantay Balita sa Kamara (2019–2020)
 Dobol B: Bantay Balita sa Senado (2019–2020)
 Dobol E sa Dobol B (1995–2002)
 Easy-Easy Lang! (2014–2019)
 Eskuwelahang Munti (1952–1963)
 Espie Espesyal with Espie Fabon
 Eye to Eye (Radio edition)
 Francis "Kiko" Flores on Board (2019–2021)
 Frontpage: Ulat ni Mel Tiangco (GMA Network simulcast) (2002–2004)
 GMA Balita (GMA Network simulcast) (1990–1995)
 Gulong ng Palad
 Harana Na, Balita Pa! (2007–2019)
 Helen of Joy (1974–1979)
 HOT T.V. (GMA Network simulcast) (2012–2013)
 Ikaw Na Ba? (A special radio program for elections)
 The RGMA Presidential Interview (2010; 2016; 2022)
 The RGMA Vice-Presidential Interview (2010; 2016; 2022)
 The RGMA Senatorial Interview (2013; 2019)
 I M Ready sa Dobol B (2017–2021) (Became a segment of Super Balita sa Umaga Saturday Edition)
 In Touch with Dr. Charles Stanley (2001–2004)
 Inday ng Buhay Ko (1981–1996)
 Isyu ATBP. (2019–2020) (Became a segment of Super Balita sa Umaga Saturday Edition)
 Isyu ng Bayan (2003–2015)
 Jimmy Gil Live! (2002–2021)
 Kahapon Lamang (1975–1989)
 Kahapon Lamang Ngayon (1990–1998)
 Kahapon Lamang sa Dobol B (2008–2020)
 Kapwa Ko Mahal Ko (Radio edition)
 Kape at Balita (1991–1993)
 Kay Susan Tayo! sa Super Radyo DZBB (2010–2014; 2019–2020)
 Kuro-Kuro ni Sen. Soc Rodrigo (1964)
 Kwentong Kutsero (1956–1957)
 Ladies' Room (2002–2019)
 La Tondena Amateur Hour (1950-1961)
 Liwanag sa Balita (2006–2022)
 Lovingly Yours, Helen (1979–1984; 1986–1992)
 Lucky Telephone (1950–1959)
 Manang Rose / Super Kalusugan (1976–2015)
 Maskara (Radio drama)
 Mel and Joey (GMA Network simulcast) (2004–2011)
 Metro Balita (1992–1998)
 Mr. Public Service (1990–1998)
 Mr. Kariñoso  (2000–2018)
 MX3 Health Watch (2015–2021)
 One on One with Igan kasama si Lala Roque (2008–2014)
 Nagmamahal, Manay Gina (2003–2009)
 News and Commentary (2015–2019)
 Newscoop (1955–1972)
 Morning
 Afternoon
 Evening
 Weekend
 Pacquiao's Fights on Radio
 Natural Kay Orly at Fernan Na! (2012–2013)
OMJ: Oh My Job (2020–2022)
 Pag-Usapan Natin
 Partners Mel and Jay (GMA Network simulcast) (1996–2004)
 Partners Mel & Jay sa Dobol B (1996–1998)
 Patibong: MPD in Action (1981–1988)
 Perlas ng Silanganan with Ric de la Rosa
 Philippine Agenda (2007)
 Pira-Pirasong Pangarap (1998–2003)
 Press It, Win It (2010)
 Pusong Wagi
 Radyo Taliba (1974–1987)
 Ricky D' Great Show (1983–1992)
 Sabado Nights (2000–2017)
 Sa Banda Rine (1986–1989)
 Sa Bawat Sandali (1982–2000)
 Saksi (Radio drama)
 Sandali Po Lamang (1973–1991)
 Sa Totoo Lang (1991–2007)
 Say Mo, Say Ko, Say N'yo! (2011–2019)
 Señor Balita (1989–1999)
 S-Files (GMA Network simulcast) (2005–2007)
 Showbiz Central (GMA Network simulcast)  (2007–2012)
 Sino? (2018–2020) (Fused back into a segment of Saksi sa Dobol B)
 Jeng Jeng
 Balitawit
 Public Apology
 Si Susan Na, Si Arnell Pa! (2008–2010)
 Spin It, Win It! (2010)
 Startalk (GMA Network simulcast) (2005–2013)
 Student Canteen (GMA Network simulcast)
 Super Balita Hatinggabi Edition
 Super Balita Panghapunan (1999–2000)
 Super Balita sa Gabi Weekend (1999–2019)
 Super Balita Tanghalian Edition (1999–2006)
 Super Igme (1999–2002)
 Super Kalusugan (2019–2020)
 Super Kuyang (1999–2019)
 Super Radyo Nationwide (2000–2020) 
 Super Radyo Nobela (2020-2022)
 Super Tambalan (2016–2018)
 Tagalog News (1950–1955)
 Talk to Mama Emma (2018–2020)
 Tanghalan ng Kampeon (GMA Network simulcast) (1988–1993)
 Tanong ng Bayan (1995–2016)
 Tapatan with Jay Sonza (Radio edition) (1996–2000)
 Tawag ng Tanghalan (originally known as Purico Amateur Hour) (1950–1953)
 Tawag-Pansin (1986–1995)
 Tayo'y Mag-aliw with Paeng Yabut (1957–1995)
 The Jessica Soho's Presidential Interviews (Eleksyon 2022) (GMA Network simulcast) (January 22, 2022) 
 Tugon at Aksyon
 Tunog ng Quarantine/Tunog Forever (2020-2022; simulcast from Barangay LS 97.1)
 Walang Siyesta! (The Badingdings) (2016–2019)
 Words and Music
 W Dobol Team (2020–2021)

See also
DZBB
GMA Integrated News and Public Affairs

Notes

References

Super Radyo
Philippine radio programs
DZBB